Oak Park or Oaks Park is the name of several places, including:

Australia
Oak Park, Victoria, a suburb of Melbourne

Ireland
 Oak Park, County Carlow, a country estate turned park

United States
Oak Park, California (Ventura County) an unincorporated community in Ventura County
Oak Park Estates, California, an unincorporated community in Calaveras County
Oak Park, San Diego, California, a neighborhood
Oak Park, Sacramento, California, a neighborhood
Oak Park, Tampa, Florida, a neighborhood
Oak Park, Georgia
Oak Park, Illinois
Oak Park Township, Cook County, Illinois
Oak Park, Indiana
Oak Park, Michigan
Oak Park, Minnesota
Oak Park, Minot, North Dakota
Oaks Amusement Park in Portland, Oregon
Oaks Park (stadium), a baseball stadium in Emeryville, California, just outside Oakland, California
Oak Park Mall in Overland Park, Kansas

See also
Oak Park station (disambiguation)
Oakes Park (disambiguation)
Oaks Park (London), a public park in London, UK
Oaks Park High School (disambiguation)